The Lizzadro Museum of Lapidary Art is a museum dedicated to the lapidary arts with displays of gemstones, jewelry and bejeweled objects, and exhibits on earth science. The museum was founded in Elmhurst, Illinois, United States, in 1962, but moved to Oak Brook, Illinois in 2019.

History
The Lizzadro Museum of Lapidary Art was opened on November 4, 1962. The museum was founded by Joseph Lizzadro, an Italian immigrant to the United States who began collecting jades as part of his interest in cutting and polishing precious stones for jewelry. His collection came to include pieces made of amber, ivory, coral, agate, and other gemstones. As his collection grew, he made an agreement with the city of Elmhurst, Illinois, and the Elmhurst Park District to open a museum in the city's Wilder Park.

The Lizzadro Museum of Lapidary Art is a Smithsonian affiliate. It has curated several exhibitions of jewelry from the Smithsonian's collections.

In 2017, the museum made plans to move from Elmhurst to a new building in Oak Brook, Illinois, to gain space and provide more modern amenities to visitors. This move began in 2019, but, due to the COVID-19 pandemic, it was unable to reopen until 2021.

Collections
The lapidary arts form the core of the Lizzadro Museum's collections, particularly jade carvings. However, the museum also displays a selection of uncarved gemstones, fossils, and other minerals, as well as sculptures, mosaics, dioramas, and a miniature castle made of carved stone and gold called "Castle Lizzadro".

References

External links
 Official website

1962 establishments in Illinois
Museums established in 1962
Art museums and galleries in Illinois
Science museums in Illinois
Asian art museums in the United States
Decorative arts museums in the United States
Museums in DuPage County, Illinois
Oak Brook, Illinois